The 1902–03 Scottish Cup was the 30th season of Scotland's most prestigious football knockout competition. The cup was won by Rangers when they beat Heart of Midlothian 2–0 in the final at Celtic Park after two replays to claim the trophy for a fourth time.

Calendar

First round

First round replay

First round second replay

Game Abandoned

First round third replay

Second round

Game Abandoned

Second round replay

Game Abandoned

Second round second replay

Quarter-final

Quarter-final replay

Quarter-final second replay

Semi-finals

Semi-final replay

Final

Final replay

Final second replay

Teams

See also
1902–03 in Scottish football

References

RSSF Scottish Cup 02-03

Scottish Cup seasons
Cup
1902–03 domestic association football cups